Zelen Breg is a dispersed settlement in the hills north of Ravne na Koroškem in the Carinthia region in northern Slovenia. Locally the settlement is known as Šelenberg.

References

External links
Zelen Breg on Geopedia

Populated places in the Municipality of Ravne na Koroškem